The Student of Prague (German: Der Student von Prag) is a 1935 German horror film directed by Arthur Robison and starring Anton Walbrook, Theodor Loos and Dorothea Wieck. It is based on the eponymous novel by Hanns Heinz Ewers which had previously been adapted into celebrated silent films on two occasions. It was shot at the Johannisthal and EFA Studios in Berlin. The film's sets were designed by the art director Karl Haacker.

Cast 
 Anton Walbrook as Balduin 
 Theodor Loos as Dr. Carpis
 Dorothea Wieck as Julia
 Erich Fiedler as Baron Waldis
  as Lydia
 Karl Hellmer as Krebs
 Volker von Collande as Zavrel
 Fritz Genschow as Dahl
 Elsa Wagner as Jarmila
 Miliza Korjus as Julia

Critical reception
Writing for The Spectator in 1936, Graham Greene characterized the film as "dull [and] a curiosity, a relic of the classical German film of silent days". Negatively comparing the film to Galeen's 1926 version of the story, Greene found that the story was less believable and the acting less memorable. In favor of the film, Greene noted "one can say at any rate that it is on the right side".

See also 
 The Student of Prague (1913)
 The Student of Prague (1926)

References

External links 

1930s fantasy films
1935 horror films
1935 films
German horror films
Films of Nazi Germany
Films directed by Arthur Robison
Films based on works by Hanns Heinz Ewers
Films set in Prague
Films set in the 1820s
Remakes of German films
Sound film remakes of silent films
German black-and-white films
Tobis Film films
1930s historical films
German historical fantasy films
Cine-Allianz films
1930s German films
Films shot at Halensee Studios
Films shot at Johannisthal Studios
1930s German-language films